'Take It On Up' is the second album by R&B band Pockets released in 1978 by Columbia Records. The album reached no. 22 on the Billboard Top R&B Albums chart.

Track listing

References

1978 albums
Columbia Records albums
Albums produced by Maurice White